is a Japanese film and television actress. She was discovered by Shōhei Imamura as a newcomer and cast in the film Pigs and Battleships. She went on to appear in films like Imamura's The Insect Woman, Kaneto Shindō's Onibaba, for which she received the Blue Ribbon Award for Best Supporting Actress, and Akira Kurosawa's Dodes'ka-den. She retired from acting in 1970, but returned in 1980 and continues to work to this day.

Yoshimura was married to actor Tetsuo Ishidate from 1968 to 1999. Her sister is actress Mari Yoshimura (1935–).

Filmography (selected)

References

External links
 
 
 

Japanese actresses
Living people
1943 births